Maryia Zhodzik (born 19 January 1997) is a Belarusian athlete who competes in the high jump and was the 2020 national champion.

She won the high jump at the Belarusian national championships in 2020. She was named to the Belarusian team for the delayed 2020 Summer Games in Tokyo. However, she was not permitted to compete as she was ruled as not meeting the minimum testing requirements of the Anti-Doping Rules for her country by the Athletics Integrity Unit.

References

1997 births
Living people
Belarusian female high jumpers